Sailing employs the wind—acting on sails, wingsails or kites—to propel a craft on the surface of the water (sailing ship, sailboat, raft, windsurfer, or kitesurfer), on ice (iceboat) or on land (land yacht) over a chosen course, which is often part of a larger plan of navigation.

From prehistory until the second half of the 19th century, sailing craft were the primary means of maritime trade and transportation; exploration across the seas and oceans was reliant on sail for anything other than the shortest distances. Naval power in this period used sail to varying degrees depending on the current technology, culminating in the gun-armed sailing warships of the Age of Sail. Sail was slowly replaced by steam as the method of propulsion for ships over the latter part of the 19th century – seeing a gradual improvement in the technology of steam through a number of stepwise developments. Steam allowed scheduled services that ran at higher average speeds than sailing vessels. Large improvements in fuel economy allowed steam to progressively outcompete sail in, ultimately, all commercial situations, giving ship-owning investors a better return on capital.

In the 21st century, most sailing represents a form of recreation or sport. Recreational sailing or yachting can be divided into racing and cruising.  Cruising can include extended offshore and ocean-crossing trips, coastal sailing within sight of land, and daysailing.

Sailing relies on the physics of sails as they derive power from the wind, generating both lift and drag. On a given course, the sails are set to an angle that optimizes the development of wind power, as determined by the apparent wind, which is the wind as sensed from a moving vessel. The forces transmitted via the sails are resisted by forces from the hull, keel, and rudder of a sailing craft, by forces from skate runners of an iceboat, or by forces from wheels of a land sailing craft which are steering the course. This combination of forces means that it is possible to sail an upwind course as well as downwind. The course with respect to the true wind direction (as would be indicated by a stationary flag) is called a point of sail. Conventional sailing craft cannot derive wind power on a course with a point of sail that is too close into the wind.

History

Throughout history, sailing was a key form of propulsion that allowed for greater mobility than travel over land. This greater mobility increased capacity for exploration, trade, transport, warfare, and fishing, especially when compared to overland options.

Until the significant improvements in land transportation that occurred during the 19th century, if water transport was an option, it was faster, cheaper and safer than making the same journey by land. This applied equally to sea crossings, coastal voyages and use of rivers and lakes. Examples of the consequences of this include the large grain trade in the Mediterranean during the classical period. Cities such as Rome were totally reliant on the delivery by sailing ships of the large amounts of grain needed. It has been estimated that it cost less for a sailing ship of the Roman Empire to carry grain the length of the Mediterranean than to move the same amount 15 miles by road. Rome consumed about 150,000 tons of Egyptian grain each year over the first three centuries AD.

A similar but more recent trade, in coal, was from the mines situated close to the River Tyne to London – which was already being carried out in the 14th century and grew as the city increased in size. In 1795, 4,395 cargoes of coal were delivered to London. This would have needed a fleet of about 500 sailing colliers (making 8 or 9 trips a year). This quantity had doubled by 1839. (The first steam-powered collier was not launched until 1852 and sailing colliers continued working into the 20th century.)

Exploration and research 

The earliest image suggesting the use of sail on a boat may be on a piece of pottery from Mesopotamia, dated to the 6th millennia BCE. The image is thought to show a bipod mast mounted on the hull of a reed boat – no sail is depicted. The earliest representation of a sail, from Egypt, is dated to circa 3100 BCE. The Nile is considered a suitable place for early use of sail for propulsion. This is because the river's current flows from south to north, whilst the prevailing wind direction is north to south. Therefore, a boat of that time could use the current to go north – an unobstructed trip of 750 miles – and sail to make the return trip. Evidence of early sailors has also been found in other locations, such as Kuwait, Turkey, Syria, Minoa, Bahrain, and India, among others.

Austronesian peoples used sails from some time before 2000 BCE. Their expansion from what is now Southern China and Taiwan started in 3000 BCE. Their technology came to include outriggers, catamarans, and crab claw sails, which enabled the Austronesian Expansion at around 3000 to 1500 BCE into the islands of Maritime Southeast Asia, and thence to Micronesia, Island Melanesia, Polynesia, and Madagascar. Since there is no commonality between the boat technology of China and the Austronesians, these distinctive characteristics must have been developed at or some time after the beginning of the expansion. They traveled vast distances of open ocean in outrigger canoes using navigation methods such as stick charts. The windward sailing capability of Austronesian boats allowed a strategy of sailing to windward on a voyage of exploration, with a return downwind either to report a discovery or if no land was found. This was well suited to the prevailing winds as Pacific islands were steadily colonized.

By the time of the Age of Discovery—starting in the 15th century—square-rigged, multi-masted vessels were the norm and were guided by navigation techniques that included the magnetic compass and making sightings of the sun and stars that allowed transoceanic voyages.

During the Age of Discovery, sailing ships figured in European voyages around Africa to China and Japan; and across the Atlantic Ocean to North and South America. Later, sailing ships ventured into the Arctic to explore northern sea routes and assess natural resources. In the 18th and 19th centuries sailing vessels made Hydrographic surveys to develop charts for navigation and, at times, carried scientists aboard as with the voyages of James Cook and the Second voyage of HMS Beagle with naturalist Charles Darwin.

Commerce 

In the early 1800s, fast blockade-running schooners and brigantines—Baltimore Clippers—evolved into three-masted, typically ship-rigged sailing vessels with fine lines that enhanced speed, but lessened capacity for high-value cargo, like tea from China. Clippers yielded to bulkier, slower vessels, which became economically competitive in the mid 19th century. Sail plans with just fore-and-aft sails (schooners), or a mixture of the two (brigantines, barques and barquentines) emerged. Coastal top-sail schooners with a crew as small as two managing the sail handling became an efficient way to carry bulk cargo, since only the fore-sails required tending while tacking and steam-driven machinery was often available for raising the sails and the anchor.

Iron-hulled sailing ships represented the final evolution of sailing ships at the end of the Age of Sail. They were built to carry bulk cargo for long distances in the nineteenth and early twentieth centuries. They were the largest of merchant sailing ships, with three to five masts and square sails, as well as other sail plans. They carried bulk cargoes between continents. Iron-hulled sailing ships were mainly built from the 1870s to 1900, when steamships began to outpace them economically because of their ability to keep a schedule regardless of the wind.  Steel hulls also replaced iron hulls at around the same time. Even into the twentieth century, sailing ships could hold their own on transoceanic voyages such as Australia to Europe, since they did not require bunkerage for coal nor fresh water for steam, and they were faster than the early steamers, which usually could barely make . Ultimately, the steamships' independence from the wind and their ability to take shorter routes, passing through the Suez and Panama Canals, made sailing ships uneconomical.

Naval power 

Until the general adoption of carvel-built ships that relied on an internal skeleton structure to bear the weight of the ship and for gun ports to be cut in the side, sailing ships were just vehicles for delivering fighters to the enemy for engagement. Early Phoenician, Greek, Roman galleys would ram each other, then pour onto the decks of the opposing force and continue the fight by hand, meaning that these galleys required speed and maneuverability. This need for speed translated into longer ships with multiple rows of oars along the sides, known as biremes and triremes. Typically, the sailing ships during this time period were the merchant ships.

By 1500, Gun ports allowed sailing vessels to sail alongside an enemy vessel and fire a broadside of multiple cannon. This development allowed for naval fleets to array themselves into a line of battle, whereby, warships would maintain their place in the line to engage the enemy in a parallel or perpendicular line.

Modern applications 

While the use of sailing vessels for commerce or naval power has been supplanted with engine-driven vessels, there continue to be commercial operations that take passengers on sailing cruises. Modern navies also employ sailing vessels to train cadets in seamanship. Recreation or sport accounts for the bulk of sailing in modern boats.

Recreation 
Recreational sailing can be divided into two categories, day-sailing, where one gets off the boat for the night, and cruising, where one stays aboard.

Day-sailing primarily affords experiencing the pleasure of sailing a boat. No destination is required. It is an opportunity to share the experience with others.

Cruising on a sailing yacht may be either near-shore or passage-making out of sight of land and entails the use of sailboats that support sustained overnight use. Coastal cruising grounds include areas of the Mediterranean and Black Seas, Northern Europe, Western Europe and islands of the North Atlantic, West Africa and the islands of the South Atlantic, the Caribbean, and regions of North and Central America. Passage-making under sail occurs on routes through oceans all over the world. Circular routes exist between the Americas and Europe, and between South Africa and South America. There are many routes from the Americas, Australia, New Zealand, and Asia to island destinations in the South Pacific. Some cruisers circumnavigate the globe.

Sport 

Sailing as a sport is organized on a hierarchical basis, starting at the yacht club level and reaching up into national and international federations; it may entail racing yachts, sailing dinghies, or other small, open sailing craft, including iceboats and land yachts. Sailboat racing is governed by World Sailing with most racing formats using the Racing Rules of Sailing. It entails a variety of different disciplines, including:
Oceanic racing, held over long distances and in open water, often last multiple days and include world circumnavigation, such as the Vendée Globe and The Ocean Race.
Fleet racing, featuring multiple boats in a regatta that comprises multiple races or heats.
Match racing comprises two boats competing against each other, as is done with the America's Cup, vying to cross a finish line, first.
Team racing between two teams of three boats each in a format analogous to match racing.
Speed sailing to set new records for different categories of craft with oversight by the World Sailing Speed Record Council.
Sail boarding has a variety of disciplines particular to that sport.

Navigation

Point of sail

A sailing craft's ability to derive power from the wind depends on the point of sail it is on—the direction of travel under sail in relation to the true wind direction over the surface. The principal points of sail roughly correspond to 45° segments of a circle, starting with 0° directly into the wind. For many sailing craft, the arc spanning 45° on either side of the wind is a "no-go" zone, where a sail is unable to mobilize power from the wind. Sailing on a course as close to the wind as possible—approximately 45°—is termed "close-hauled". At 90° off the wind, a craft is on a "beam reach". At 135° off the wind, a craft is on a "broad reach". At 180° off the wind (sailing in the same direction as the wind), a craft is "running downwind".

In points of sail that range from close-hauled to a broad reach, sails act substantially like a wing, with lift predominantly propelling the craft. In points of sail from a broad reach to down wind, sails act substantially like a parachute, with drag predominantly propelling the craft. For craft with little forward resistance, such as ice boats and land yachts, this transition occurs further off the wind than for sailboats and sailing ships.

Wind direction for points of sail always refers to the true wind—the wind felt by a stationary observer. The apparent wind—the wind felt by an observer on a moving sailing craft—determines the motive power for sailing craft.

Effect on apparent wind

True wind velocity (VT) combines with the sailing craft's velocity (VB) to give the apparent wind velocity (VA), the air velocity experienced by instrumentation or crew on a moving sailing craft. Apparent wind velocity provides the motive power for the sails on any given point of sail. It varies from being the true wind velocity of a stopped craft in irons in the no-go zone, to being faster than the true wind speed as the sailing craft's velocity adds to the true windspeed on a reach. It diminishes towards zero for a craft sailing dead downwind.

The speed of sailboats through the water is limited by the resistance that results from hull drag in the water. Ice boats typically have the least resistance to forward motion of any sailing craft. Consequently, a sailboat experiences a wider range of apparent wind angles than does an ice boat, whose speed is typically great enough to have the apparent wind coming from a few degrees to one side of its course, necessitating sailing with the sail sheeted in for most points of sail. On conventional sailboats, the sails are set to create lift for those points of sail where it's possible to align the leading edge of the sail with the apparent wind.

For a sailboat, point of sail affects lateral force significantly. The higher the boat points to the wind under sail, the stronger the lateral force, which requires resistance from a keel or other underwater foils, including daggerboard, centerboard, skeg and rudder. Lateral force also induces heeling in a sailboat, which requires resistance by weight of ballast from the crew or the boat itself and by the shape of the boat, especially with a catamaran. As the boat points off the wind, lateral force and the forces required to resist it become less important.
On ice boats, lateral forces are countered by the lateral resistance of the blades on ice and their distance apart, which generally prevents heeling.

Course under sail

Wind and currents are important factors to plan on for both offshore and inshore sailing. Predicting the availability, strength and direction of the wind is key to using its power along the desired course. Ocean currents, tides and river currents may deflect a sailing vessel from its desired course.

If the desired course is within the no-go zone, then the sailing craft must follow a zig-zag route into the wind to reach its waypoint or destination. Downwind, certain high-performance sailing craft can reach the destination more quickly by following a zig-zag route on a series of broad reaches.

Negotiating obstructions or a channel may also require a change of direction with respect to the wind, necessitating changing of tack with the wind on the opposite side of the craft, from before.

Changing tack is called tacking when the wind crosses over the bow of the craft as it turns and jibing (or gybing) if the wind passes over the stern.

Upwind
A sailing craft can sail on a course anywhere outside of its no-go zone. If the next waypoint or destination is within the arc defined by the no-go zone from the craft's current position, then it must perform a series of tacking maneuvers to get there on a dog-legged route, called beating to windward. The progress along that route is called the course made good; the speed between the starting and ending points of the route is called the speed made good and is calculated by the distance between the two points, divided by the travel time. The limiting line to the waypoint that allows the sailing vessel to leave it to leeward is called the layline. Whereas some Bermuda-rigged sailing yachts can sail as close as 30° to the wind, most 20th-Century square riggers are limited to 60° off the wind. Fore-and-aft rigs are designed to operate with the wind on either side, whereas square rigs and kites are designed to have the wind come from one side of the sail only.

Because the lateral wind forces are highest on a sailing vessel, close-hauled and beating to windward, the resisting water forces around the vessel's keel, centerboard, rudder and other foils is also highest to mitigate leeway—the vessel sliding to leeward of its course. Ice boats and land yachts minimize lateral motion with sidewise resistance from their blades or wheels.

Changing tack by tacking

Tacking or coming about is a maneuver by which a sailing craft turns its bow into and through the wind (referred to as "the eye of the wind") so that the apparent wind changes from one side to the other, allowing progress on the opposite tack. The type of sailing rig dictates the procedures and constraints on achieving a tacking maneuver. Fore-and-aft rigs allow their sails to hang limp as they tack; square rigs must present the full frontal area of the sail to the wind, when changing from side to side; and windsurfers have flexibly pivoting and fully rotating masts that get flipped from side to side.

Downwind

A sailing craft can travel directly downwind only at a speed that is less than the wind speed. However, a variety of sailing craft can achieve a higher downwind velocity made good by traveling on a series of broad reaches, punctuated by jibes in between. This is true of ice boats and sand yachts. On the water it was explored by sailing vessels, starting in 1975, and now extends to high-performance skiffs, catamarans and foiling sailboats.

Navigating a channel or a downwind course among obstructions may necessitate changes in direction that require a change of tack, accomplished with a jibe.

Changing tack by jibing

Jibing or gybing is a sailing maneuver by which a sailing craft turns its stern past the eye of the wind so that the apparent wind changes from one side to the other, allowing progress on the opposite tack. This maneuver can be done on smaller boats by pulling the tiller towards yourself (the opposite side of the sail). As with tacking, the type of sailing rig dictates the procedures and constraints for jibing. Fore-and-aft sails with booms, gaffs or sprits are unstable when the free end points into the eye of the wind and must be controlled to avoid a violent change to the other side; square rigs as they present the full area of the sail to the wind from the rear experience little change of operation from one tack to the other; and windsurfers again have flexibly pivoting and fully rotating masts that get flipped from side to side.

Wind and currents 

Winds and oceanic currents are both the result of the sun powering their respective fluid media. Wind powers the sailing craft and the ocean bears the craft on its course, as currents may alter the course of a sailing vessel on the ocean or a river.
Wind – On a global scale, vessels making long voyages must take atmospheric circulation into account, which causes zones of westerlies, easterlies, trade winds and high-pressure zones with light winds, sometimes called horse latitudes, in between. Sailors predict wind direction and strength with knowledge of high- and low-pressure areas, and the weather fronts that accompany them. Along coastal areas, sailors contend with diurnal changes in wind direction—flowing off the shore at night and onto the shore during the day. Local temporary wind shifts are called lifts, when they improve the sailing craft's ability travel along its rhumb line in the direction of the next waypoint. Unfavorable wind shifts are called headers.
Currents – On a global scale, vessels making long voyages must take major ocean current circulation into account. Major oceanic currents, like the Gulf Stream in the Atlantic Ocean and the Kuroshio Current in the Pacific Ocean require planning for the effect that they will have on a transiting vessel's track. Likewise, tides affect a vessel's track, especially in areas with large tidal ranges, like the Bay of Fundy or along Southeast Alaska, or where the tide flows through straits, like Deception Pass in Puget Sound. Mariners use tide and current tables to inform their navigation. Before the advent of motors, it was advantageous for sailing vessels to enter or leave port or to pass through a strait with the tide.

Trimming

Trimming refers to adjusting the lines that control sails, including the sheets that control angle of the sails with respect to the wind, the halyards that raise and tighten the sail, and to adjusting the hull's resistance to heeling, yawing or progress through the water.

Sails 

In their most developed version, square sails are controlled by two each of: sheets,  braces, clewlines, and reef tackles, plus four buntlines, each of which may be controlled by a crew member as the sail is adjusted. Towards the end of the Age of Sail, steam-powered machinery reduced the number of crew required to trim sail.

Adjustment of the angle of a fore-and-aft sail with respect to the apparent wind is controlled with a line, called a "sheet". On points of sail between close-hauled and a broad reach, the goal is typically to create flow along the sail to maximize power through lift. Streamers placed on the surface of the sail, called tell-tales, indicate whether that flow is smooth or turbulent. Smooth flow on both sides indicates proper trim. A jib and mainsail are typically configured to be adjusted to create a smooth laminar flow, leading from one to the other in what is called the "slot effect".

On downwind points of sail, power is achieved primarily with the wind pushing on the sail, as indicated by drooping tell-tales. Spinnakers are light-weight, large-area, highly curved sails that are adapted to sailing off the wind.

In addition to using the sheets to adjust the angle with respect to the apparent wind, other lines control the shape of the sail, notably the outhaul, halyard, boom vang and backstay. These control the curvature that is appropriate to the windspeed, the higher the wind, the flatter the sail. When the wind strength is greater than these adjustments can accommodate to prevent overpowering the sailing craft, then reducing sail area through reefing, substituting a smaller sail or by other means.

Reducing sail
Reducing sail on square-rigged ships could be accomplished by exposing less of each sail, by tying it off higher up with reefing points. Additionally, as winds get stronger, sails can be furled or removed from the spars, entirely until the vessel is surviving hurricane-force winds under "bare poles".

On fore-and-aft rigged vessels, reducing sail may furling the jib and by reefing or partially lowering the mainsail, that is reducing the area of a sail without actually changing it for a smaller sail. This results both in a reduced sail area but also in a lower centre of effort from the sails, reducing the heeling moment and keeping the boat more upright.

There are three common methods of reefing the mainsail:
Slab reefing, which involves lowering the sail by about one-quarter to one-third of its full length and tightening the lower part of the sail using an outhaul or a pre-loaded reef line through a cringle at the new clew, and hook through a cringle at the new tack.
In-boom roller-reefing, with a horizontal foil inside the boom. This method allows for standard- or full-length horizontal battens.
In-mast (or on-mast) roller-reefing. This method rolls the sail up around a vertical foil either inside a slot in the mast, or affixed to the outside of the mast. It requires a mainsail with either no battens, or newly developed vertical battens.

Hull
Hull trim has three aspects, each tied to an axis of rotation, they are controlling:

 Heeling (roll about the longitudinal axis)
 Helm force (rotation about the vertical axis)
 Hull drag (rotation about the horizontal axis amidships)

Each is a reaction to forces on sails and is achieved either by weight distribution or by management of the center of force of the underwater foils (keel, daggerboard, etc.), compared with the center of force on the sails.

Heeling 

A sailing vessel heels when the boat leans over to the side in reaction to wind forces on the sails.  

A sailing vessel's form stability (the resistance of hull shape to rolling) is the starting point for resisting heeling. Catamarans and iceboats have a wide stance that makes them resistant to heeling. Additional measures for trimming a sailing craft to control heeling include:

 Ballast in the keel, which counteracts heeling as the boat rolls.
 Shifting of weight, which might be crew on a trapeze or moveable ballast across the boat.
 Reducing sail
 Adjusting the depth of underwater foils to control their lateral resistance force and center of resistance

Helm force 
The alignment of center of force of the sails with center of resistance of the hull and its appendices controls whether the craft will track straight with little steering input, or whether correction needs to be made to hold it away from turning into the wind (a weather helm) or turning away from the wind (a lee helm). A center of force behind the center of resistance causes a weather helm. The center of force ahead of the center of resistance causes a lee helm. When the two are closely aligned, the helm is neutral and requires little input to maintain course.

Hull drag 
Fore-and-aft weight distribution changes the cross-section of a vessel in the water. Small sailing craft are sensitive to crew placement. They are usually designed to have the crew stationed midships to minimize hull drag in the water.

Other aspects of seamanship
Seamanship encompasses all aspects of taking a sailing vessel in and out of port, navigating it to its destination, and securing it at anchor or alongside a dock. Important aspects of seamanship include employing a common language aboard a sailing craft and the management of lines that control the sails and rigging.

Nautical terms 

Nautical terms for elements of a vessel: starboard (right-hand side), port or larboard (left-hand side), forward or fore (frontward), aft or abaft (rearward), bow (forward part of the hull), stern (aft part of the hull), beam (the widest part). Spars, supporting sails, include masts, booms, yards, gaffs and poles. Moveable lines that control sails or other equipment are known collectively as a vessel's running rigging. Lines that raise sails are called halyards while those that strike them are called downhauls. Lines that adjust (trim) the sails are called sheets. These are often referred to using the name of the sail they control (such as main sheet or jib sheet). Guys are used to control the ends of other spars such as spinnaker poles. Lines used to tie a boat up when alongside are called docklines, docking cables or mooring warps. A rode is what attaches an anchored boat to its anchor.

Management of lines 
The following knots are commonly used to handle ropes and lines on sailing craft:
 Bowline – forms a loop at the end of a rope or line, useful for lassoing a piling.
 Cleat hitch – affixes a line to a cleat, used with docking lines.
 Clove hitch – two half hitches, used for tying onto a post or hanging a fender.
 Figure-eight – a stopper knot, prevents a line from sliding past the opening in a fitting.
 Rolling hitch – a friction hitch onto a line or a spar that pulls in one direction and slides in the other.
 Sheet bend – joins two rope ends, when improvising a longer line.
 Reef knot or square knot – used for reefing or storing a sail by tying two ends of a line together.

Lines and halyards are typically coiled neatly for stowage and reuse.

Sail physics

The physics of sailing arises from a balance of forces between the wind powering the sailing craft as it passes over its sails and the resistance by the sailing craft against being blown off course, which is provided in the water by the keel, rudder, underwater foils and other elements of the underbody of a sailboat, on ice by the runners of an iceboat, or on land by the wheels of a sail-powered land vehicle.

Forces on sails depend on wind speed and direction and the speed and direction of the craft. The speed of the craft at a given point of sail contributes to the "apparent wind"—the wind speed and direction as measured on the moving craft. The apparent wind on the sail creates a total aerodynamic force, which may be resolved into drag—the force component in the direction of the apparent wind—and lift—the force component normal (90°) to the apparent wind. Depending on the alignment of the sail with the apparent wind (angle of attack), lift or drag may be the predominant propulsive component.  Depending on the angle of attack of a set of sails with respect to the apparent wind, each sail is providing motive force to the sailing craft either from lift-dominant attached flow or drag-dominant separated flow. Additionally, sails may interact with one another to create forces that are different from the sum of the individual contributions of each sail, when used alone.

Apparent wind velocity
The term "velocity" refers both to speed and direction. As applied to wind, apparent wind velocity (VA) is the air velocity acting upon the leading edge of the most forward sail or as experienced by instrumentation or crew on a moving sailing craft. In nautical terminology, wind speeds are normally expressed in knots and wind angles in degrees. All sailing craft reach a constant forward velocity (VB) for a given true wind velocity (VT) and point of sail. The craft's point of sail affects its velocity for a given true wind velocity. Conventional sailing craft cannot derive power from the wind in a "no-go" zone that is approximately 40° to 50° away from the true wind, depending on the craft. Likewise, the directly downwind speed of all conventional sailing craft is limited to the true wind speed. As a sailboat sails further from the wind, the apparent wind becomes smaller and the lateral component becomes less; boat speed is highest on the beam reach. To act like an airfoil, the sail on a sailboat is sheeted further out as the course is further off the wind. As an iceboat sails further from the wind, the apparent wind increases slightly and the boat speed is highest on the broad reach. In order to act like an airfoil, the sail on an iceboat is sheeted in for all three points of sail.

Lift and drag on sails

Lift on a sail, acting as an airfoil, occurs in a direction perpendicular to the incident airstream (the apparent wind velocity for the headsail) and is a result of pressure differences between the windward and leeward surfaces and depends on the angle of attack, sail shape, air density, and speed of the apparent wind. The lift force results from the average pressure on the windward surface of the sail being higher than the average pressure on the leeward side. These pressure differences arise in conjunction with the curved airflow. As air follows a curved path along the windward side of a sail, there is a pressure gradient perpendicular to the flow direction with higher pressure on the outside of the curve and lower pressure on the inside. To generate lift, a sail must present an "angle of attack" between the chord line of the sail and the apparent wind velocity. The angle of attack is a function of both the craft's point of sail and how the sail is adjusted with respect to the apparent wind.

As the lift generated by a sail increases, so does lift-induced drag, which together with parasitic drag constitute total drag, which acts in a direction parallel to the incident airstream. This occurs as the angle of attack increases with sail trim or change of course and causes the lift coefficient to increase up to the point of aerodynamic stall along with the lift-induced drag coefficient. At the onset of stall, lift is abruptly decreased, as is lift-induced drag. Sails with the apparent wind behind them (especially going downwind) operate in a stalled condition.

Lift and drag are components of the total aerodynamic force on sail, which are resisted by forces in the water (for a boat) or on the traveled surface (for an iceboat or land sailing craft). Sails act in two basic modes; under the lift-predominant mode, the sail behaves in a manner analogous to a wing with airflow attached to both surfaces; under the drag-predominant mode, the sail acts in a manner analogous to a parachute with airflow in detached flow, eddying around the sail.

Lift predominance (wing mode)
Sails allow progress of a sailing craft to windward, thanks to their ability to generate lift (and the craft's ability to resist the lateral forces that result). Each sail configuration has a characteristic coefficient of lift and attendant coefficient of drag, which can be determined experimentally and calculated theoretically. Sailing craft orient their sails with a favorable angle of attack between the entry point of the sail and the apparent wind even as their course changes. The ability to generate lift is limited by sailing too close to the wind when no effective angle of attack is available to generate lift (causing luffing) and sailing sufficiently off the wind that the sail cannot be oriented at a favorable angle of attack to prevent the sail from stalling with flow separation.

Drag predominance (parachute mode)
When sailing craft are on a course where the angle between the sail and the apparent wind (the angle of attack) exceeds the point of maximum lift, separation of flow occurs. Drag increases and lift decreases with increasing angle of attack as the separation becomes progressively pronounced until the sail is perpendicular to the apparent wind, when lift becomes negligible and drag predominates. In addition to the sails used upwind, spinnakers provide area and curvature appropriate for sailing with separated flow on downwind points of sail, analogous to parachutes, which provide both lift and drag.

Wind variation with height and time

Wind speed increases with height above the surface; at the same time, wind speed may vary over short periods of time as gusts.

Wind shear affects sailing craft in motion by presenting a different wind speed and direction at different heights along the mast. Wind shear occurs because of friction above a water surface slowing the flow of air. The ratio of wind at the surface to wind at a height above the surface varies by a power law with an exponent of 0.11-0.13 over the ocean. Additionally, apparent wind direction moves aft with height above water, which may necessitate a corresponding twist in the shape of the sail to achieve attached flow with height.

Gusts may be predicted by the same value that serves as an exponent for wind shear, serving as a gust factor. So, one can expect gusts to be about 1.5 times stronger than the prevailing wind speed (a 10-knot wind might gust up to 15 knots). This, combined with changes in wind direction suggest the degree to which a sailing craft must adjust sail angle to wind gusts on a given course.

Hull physics 

Waterborne sailing craft rely on the design of the hull and keel to provide minimal forward drag in opposition to the sails' propulsive power and maximum resistance to the sails' lateral forces. In modern sailboats, drag is minimized by control of the hull's shape (blunt or fine), appendages, and slipperiness. The keel or other underwater foils provide the lateral resistance to forces on the sails. Heeling increases both drag and the ability of the boat to track along its desired course. Wave generation for a displacement hull is another important limitation on boat speed.

Drag 
Drag from its form is described by a prismatic coefficient, Cp = displaced volume of the vessel divided by waterline length times maximum displaced section area—the maximum value of Cp = 1.0 being for a constant displace cross section area, as would be found on a barge. For modern sailboats, values of 0.53 ≤ Cp ≤ 0.6 are likely because of the tapered shape of the submerged hull towards both ends. Reducing interior volume allows creating a finer hull with less drag. Because a keel or other underwater foil produces lift, it also produces drag, which increases as the boat heels. Wetted area of the hull affects total the amount of friction between the water and the hull's surface, creating another component of drag.

Lateral resistance 
Sailboats use some sort of underwater foil to generate lift that maintains the forward direction of the boat under sail. Whereas sails operate at angles of attack between 10° to 90° incident to the wind, underwater foils operate at angles of attack between 0° to 10° incident to the water passing by. Neither their angle of attack nor surface is adjustable (except for moveable foils) and they are never intentionally stalled. Heeling the vessel away from perpendicular into the water significantly degrades the boat's ability to point into the wind.

Hull speed and beyond 
Hull speed is the speed at which the wavelength of a vessel's bow wave is equal to its waterline length and is proportional to the square root of the vessel's length at the waterline. Applying more power does not significantly increase the speed of a displacement vessel beyond hull speed. This is because the vessel is climbing up an increasingly steep bow wave with the addition of power without the wave propagating forward faster.

Planing and foiling vessels are not limited by hull speed, as they rise out of the water without building a bow wave with the application of power. Long narrow hulls, such as those of catamarans, surpass hull speed by piercing through the bow wave. Hull speed does not apply to sailing craft on ice runners or wheels because they do not displace water.

See also

Dinghy racing
High-performance sailing
Land sailing
Racing Rules of Sailing
Sailing at the Summer Olympics
Single-handed sailing

Notes

References

Bibliography
"Transportation and Maps" in Virtual Vault , an online exhibition of Canadian historical art at Library and Archives Canada
 Rousmaniere, John, The Annapolis Book of Seamanship, Simon & Schuster, 1999
 Chapman Book of Piloting (various contributors), Hearst Corporation, 1999
 Herreshoff, Halsey (consulting editor), The Sailor's Handbook, Little Brown and Company, 1983
 Seidman, David, The Complete Sailor, International Marine, 1995

Further reading